Phostria syleptalis is a moth in the family Crambidae. It was described by Strand in 1918. It is found in Taiwan.

References

Phostria
Moths described in 1918
Moths of Taiwan